Tumed Left Banner (Mongolian:    Түмэд Зүүн хошуу Tümed Jegün qosiɣu) is a banner (a county-level division) in Hohhot, Inner Mongolia Autonomous Region, North China. It is under the administration of the prefecture-level city of Hohhot, the capital of the autonomous region, it is some distance to the east-northeast.

Climate

See also
 Hanggai (village)

References

www.xzqh.org 

 
Banners of Inner Mongolia
Hohhot